Jean Brichaut (born 29 July 1911, Belgium; died 1962) was a Belgian footballer.

Biography 
Starting in 1929, Brichaut played as a striker for Standard de Liège. He scored 103 goals in 163 matches. He finished second in the Belgian First Division in 1936.

Brichaut also played 12 matches and scored 3 goals for the Diables Rouges, from 1932 to 1936. Picked for the 1934 World Cup, he did not play in the tournament.

Honours
 Belgian international from 1932 to 1936 (12 caps and 3 goals)
 Picked for the 1934 Italy World Cup (did not play)
 Belgian league runners-up in 1936 with Standard de Liège

References

External links
 

Belgian footballers
Belgium international footballers
1934 FIFA World Cup players
Standard Liège players
1911 births
1962 deaths
Footballers from Liège
Association football forwards